Richard "Doc" Walker (born May 28, 1955) is a former American football tight end in the National Football League (NFL), who played for the Cincinnati Bengals and the Washington Redskins.  He is currently a radio sports commentator.

Playing career
Walker played college football at UCLA and won the 1976 Rose Bowl with them.  He was drafted in the fourth round for the 1977 NFL Draft by the Bengals.  He moved to the Redskins in 1980 and contributed to the team winning Super Bowl XVII.

Broadcasting career

Walker currently covers sports during radio broadcasts in the Washington Metro Area.  He hosts his own show on ESPN 980.  He hosts a weekly television show called "Doc Walker's ProView," which airs Sunday mornings on ESPN 980 and Tuesday evenings at 11pm on MASN.  In 2011, he moved into the color analyst’s seat for radio broadcasts of Washington Football Team games on ESPN 980 after previously serving as the sideline reporter. As of 2019, he is currently once again the sideline reporter for Washington Football Team radio broadcasts. 

Previously he had been a co-host on The John Thompson Show and The Locker room with Doc Walker and Kevin Sheehan.  He also appears in D.C. Lottery and BMW of Sterling commercials.  He previously worked for Westwood One as a color commentator for college football broadcasts and a sideline reporter and occasional color commentator for the NFL on Westwood One.  Up until the 2010 college football season, he was also the main color analyst for ACC football games for Raycom Sports with Steve Martin.

References

External links
 

1955 births
Living people
American football tight ends
Arena football announcers
Cincinnati Bengals players
College football announcers
Washington Redskins players
National Football League announcers
UCLA Bruins football players
People from Cherry Point, North Carolina